Jean-Marie Massaud (born 1966 in Toulouse, France) is a French architect, inventor and designer. He was born in Toulouse, France in 1966.

Massuad graduated from the École Nationale Supérieur de Création Industrielle - Les Ateliers, Paris (ENSCI) in 1990 and began working with Marc Berthier. In 2000, he co-founded the Studio Massaud with Daniel Pouzet and expanded his interests in the fields of architecture.

Since the beginning of his career (a 1990 graduate of Paris' ENSCI-Les Ateliers, Paris Design Institute), Jean-Marie Massaud has been working on an extensive range of works, stretching from architecture to objects, from one-off project to serial ones, from macro environment down to micro contexts. His work spans architecture and the full spectrum of object design—from bespoke furniture and industrial products, to, more recently, futuristic installations like a helium-filled airship hotel. Major brands have solicited his ability to mix comfort and elegance, zeitgeist and heritage, generosity and distinction.

Massaud has run a quest for synthesis, reduction and lightness since his first intuitions. He has been working all kind of design fields, from furniture to industrial product and equipment. In 2000, he founds Studio Massaud and expands his expertise to architecture and brand development. He collaborates with various brands such as B&B Italia, Axor Hansgrohe, Dior, Poliform, Poltrona Frau, Lancôme or Renault.

His collaboration with Marc Berthier and his work in the field of town planning led him towards design and architecture. He is concerned with design in various contexts, industrial products and furniture. His contextual approach centres on research into the essential, within which the individual remains the centre of attention. It is a work upheld by research into the senses, magic, and vital emotion which brings him to work with very different brands.

Beyond these elegant designs, his quest for lightness – in matters of essence – synthesize three broader stakes: individual and collective fulfillment, economic and industrial efficiency, and environmental concerns. "I'm trying to find an honest, generous path with the idea that, somewhere between the hard economic data, there are users. People."

His creations, whether speculative or pragmatic, explore this imperative paradigm: reconciling pleasure with responsibility, the individual with the collective. When asked to imagine a new stadium for the city of Guadalajara, Mexico, he comes back with a never seen before cloud and volcano-shaped building, integrated in a vast urban-development program that re-unite leisure and culture, nature and urbanization, sport aficionados and local citizens. Instead of implanting a stadium, he proposed an environment. And the initial vision has proven a realistic approach: the project has come to life in July 2011.

More recently, his concept car developed in partnership with major car brand, has the same objective. MEWE is a synthesis of economical and ecological concepts, integrating issues specific to each stakeholder: the user, industry, and the environment. A pioneering multiple-use platform that is a car for the people, with a body in expanded polypropylene foam: a major innovation. "When I'm working on a project, there’s always an attempt to renew the subject I’m involved in". Another distinctive aspect of his approach.

Denying trend and fashion, Jean Marie prefers questioning the existing, working out on progress and eventually proposing answers to contemporary stakes. It is this symbiosis between Man, his creations and his natural environment, that Jean Marie Massaud strives. to reach, as a catalyst to innovation, as an economic model and as a life project.

His unique style is reflected throughout: from the product design through to the architecture. His creations are intended to have an effect on people. And to create a better living space for them. Heavily influenced by the beauty and usefulness of the natural world, he loves to combine design and architecture.

Massaud has said he draws design inspiration from the thoughtful elegance of Charles & Ray Eames, the eclecticism of Philippe Starck and Castiglioni Brothers, the sharpness of Antonio Citterio, and the expansive creativity of Leonardo da Vinci and Thomas Edison.

Jean Marie Massaud's approach to design - whether furniture, cars, interior design, architecture or urban planning - begins with the idea of innovation in terms of environmental sustainability, economic efficiency and collective and individual well-being. The aim of his work is to create organic projects that connect people and nature. Nature, in fact, is the primary source of inspiration for the designer, who pursues solutions that can arouse emotions in their users. The result is an unmistakable style characterised by simple elements, essential lines and extraordinary lightness.

Massaud has taught at Domus Academy in Milan and the European Institute of Design in Turin. He also received numerous prizes and awards, including the ADI Compasso d'Oro in 2011 for the Yale sofa by MDF Italia; the 2012 Wallpaper Design Award for the Seax folding chair by Dedon; the 2012 Red Dot Design Award Best of the Best for the best radiator with Blow, created for Cordivari Design. This was followed by the 2014 Wallpaper Design Awards in the "Best Room Mates" category for Poltrona Frau's GranTorino modular sofa collection and, that same year, the Muuuz International Award for the Airberg sofa for Offecct. Massaud also designed the Green Island seating collection for Offecct, winner of the Green Good Design Award in 2016. His works have been awarded several prizes and many of his designs are nowadays on show in the design collections of the major museums worldwide: from Amsterdam, Chicago, London, Paris and Zurich: from the permanent collection of the Musée National d'Art Moderne de Paris to the permanent collections of the Museum für Gestaltung, Zürich, of The Chicago Athenaeum- Museum of Architecture and Design, of The Stedelijk Museum, Amsterdam and of The Musée des arts Décoratifs, Paris.

Awards and distinctions
 1994-96 3 Top Ten, Italy
 1995-98 Compasso d'Oro: 3 selections, Italy
 1995 VIA Carte Blanche, Paris 
 1996 First prize, Maquill'Art, Paris; Grand Prix de la Presse Internationale et de la Critique du Meuble Contemporain 1996; FORM Prize, Germany; Chair of the year (Promosedia dell'Anno), Italy 
 1999 Nombre d'Or (Salon du Meuble in Paris), France
 2000 Arests Best - Best Perfume Bottle (NEMO Cacharel), Norway
 2001 Etoiles APCI Observeur du Design (Ness Collection & Sephora Blanc), France
 2002 Talents du Luxe, Paris
 2004 APCI Observer du Design (Ness Collection & Sephora Blanc), France
 2005 Designer of the Year, ELLE DECO, France; Best Eco Design (Human Nature), DesignTide, Tokyo 
 2006 IF Product - Forum Prize - AXOR collection
 2007 Créateur de l’Année of the 2007 Paris Salon du Meuble
 2010 Estadio Chivas de Guadalajara, Zapopan, Jalisco, Mexico
 2015 Red Dot Award for the Massaud Work Lounge With Ottoman, manufactured by Coalesse

References

External links

 massaud.com
 Jean-Marie Massaud Furniture

1966 births
21st-century French architects
French furniture designers
Living people
Architects from Toulouse
Compasso d'Oro Award recipients